The State Register of Heritage Places is maintained by the Heritage Council of Western Australia. , 166 places are heritage-listed in the Shire of Northam, of which 40 are on the State Register of Heritage Places.

List
The Western Australian State Register of Heritage Places, lists the following 40 state registered places within the Shire of Northam:

Notes

 A search for Northam LGA returns 392 hits, of which 221 are for the Northampton LGA, 166 are for Northam LGA while five are multi-region entries
 A search for Northam LGA returns 70 hits, of which 30 are for the Northampton LGA and 40 for Northam LGA
 No coordinates specified by Inherit database

References

Northam
 
Northam